This article lists historical events that occurred between 1–100 in modern-day Lebanon or regarding its people.

Administration

Kingdom at the Beqaa

in AD 39, the district of Iturea was given by Caligula to a certain Soemus, he was also known as the tetrarch of Lebanon by the Romano-Jewish historian Josephus. Soemus reigned until his death in AD 49, when his kingdom was incorporated into the province of Syria (Tacitus, Annals, xii. 23).

In AD 41, at Herod Agrippa's request, his brother Herod was given Chalcis in the Beqaa Valley, with its center of worship being Baalbek, and allowed the title of basileus by Claudius. King Herod of Chalcis reigned until his death in AD 48, whereupon his kingdom was given to Agrippa's son Agrippa II, though only as a tetrarchy.

In the Acts of the Apostles 12.20, in which Herod Agrippa is 'depicted as a typical persecuting tyrant', it's mentioned that the king furiously quarrelled with the people of Sidon and Tyre, and forbade the export of food to them. As they were dependent on delivery of food from Judea, and Judea was affected by famine, the two cities joined and sought an audience with him. After they secured support of Blastus, a trusted personal servant of the king, they asked for peace, because they depended on the king's country for their food supply.

Agrippa II expended large sums in beautifying  Berytus (ancient Beirut), a Hellenised city in Phoenicia. His partiality for the Lebanese city rendered him unpopular amongst his Jewish subjects. He was forced to give up the tetrarchy of Chalcis in AD 53, but in exchange Claudius made him ruler with the title of king over the territories previously governed by Philip the Tetrarch (Batanea, Trachonitis and Gaulanitis), and Lysanias (Abilene).

Reign of Vespasian
When the Roman emperor Vespasian and king Agrippa came to Tyre, the inhabitants of the city began to speak reproachfully of the king, and called him an enemy to the Romans; for they said that Philip, the general of his army, had betrayed the royal palace and the Roman forces that were in Jerusalem, and that it was done by his command. When Vespasian heard of this report, he rebuked the Tyrians for abusing a man who was "both a king and a friend to the Romans".

End of Chalcis
The tetrarchy of Chalcis previously surrendered by Agrippa II was subsequently in 57 given to his cousin Aristobulus, the son of Herod of Chalcis. After the death of Aristobulus in AD 92, Chalcis was absorbed into the province of Syria.

According to Photius, Agrippa II died at the age of seventy in the third year of the reign of Trajan (AD 100), but statements of Josephus, in addition to the contemporary epigraphy from his kingdom. The modern scholarly consensus holds that he died before 93/94. Following his death his realm of Chalcis at the Beqaa as well came under the direct rule of Rome.

Events

20s 

 The Lebanese Roman Latin grammarian, literature master, philologist and critic Marcus Valerius Probus, who flourished under the reign of Nero, is born in Berytus, .

30s

 Persecution of Christians in Jerusalem forces many followers to seek refuge in Lebanon around AD 34.
 Sohemus is tetrarch of Lebanon, AD 39.

40s

 Tiberius Julius Abdes Pantera, a Lebanese Roman-Phoenician soldier born in Sidon, dies in AD 40, at the age of 62 years.
 Herod I of Chalcis reigns as ruler of Chalcis, a small ancient kingdom of the Beqaa Valley, AD 41.

 Lebanese antiquarian writer of grammatical, lexical and historical works and writer of Phoenician history Philo of Byblos is born .
 The tower of Claudius in Qalaat Faqra, Kisrawan is completed in 43 AD.
 The temple of Zeus Beelgalasos, a sanctuary of Atargatis dedicated to Agrippa II and his sister Berenice, and two altars, are built in AD 44 in Qalaat Faqra.
 Herod I dies in AD 48, passing his throne to his son, Herod Agrippa II.

50s
 In AD 53, Agrippa II  is forced to give up the tetrarchy of Chalcis, in exchange Claudius made him ruler with the title of king over the territories previously governed by Philip.
 The tetrarchy of Chalcis is given to Agrippa's cousin, Aristobulus, AD 57.
 Paul the Apostle visits Tyre in AD 58 and meet with the Disciples and stays with them for 7 days. They pleaded with him not to go to Jerusalem due to persecution against Christians there.

60s
 Paul the Apostle is allowed, on his way to Rome as a prisoner around AD 60, to meet his friends in Sidon.

 According to tradition, Thaddeus, together with Simon the Zealot, both apostles of Jesus, suffer martyrdom about AD 65 in Beirut.
 The city of Tyre helps the emperors Titus and Vespasian to suffocate the Jewish revolt in Palestine in AD 66.
 Amiries, ancestor of the Saliba family in Bteghrine, is baptized in AD 67 by John the apostle.
 Shortly after the acclamation of Vespasian had occurred at Alexandria on July 1st, Vespasian and Mucianus – a prominent senator, governor of Syria, and a man who had been instrumental in persuading Vespasian to bid for the imperial throne – hold a conference at Berytus, planning their campaign in mid-July, AD 69.
 Lucius Antonius Naso, native of Baalbek, serves as tribune of the Praetorian Guard in the year 69.

70s
 The Lebanese cartographer and mathematician Marinus of Tyre is born, . The projection method of his charts, from the Atlantic to China, will be picked up and revived by Mercator fourteen centuries later.

80s
 El-Gouth, a Lebanese folk hero who was said to be called "El-Saleeby" by an Arabian prince for his wars against Jews and idolaters in defense of the Christian faith, is born in the year of AD 89.

90s
 Aristobulus of Chalcis dies in AD 92, causing Chalcis to be absorbed into the Roman province of Syria.

Ecclesiastical administration

According to tradition, the diocese of Tripoli in Phoenicia was founded in the apostolic age with Maron chosen as the first bishop by the apostle Peter, and Tyre was the seat of one of the oldest Christian communities, dating back to the dawn of Christianity, and Quartus was the bishop of Berytus (Beirut) . Traditionally, the Evangelist Mark is considered to have been the first Bishop of Byblos and Silas (Silouan) the first Bishop of Botris, both assigned to their sees by the Apostle Peter.  

The city of Tyre is mentioned in the Gospels in a proverb quoted by Jesus himself (Matthew 11,21); according to the testimony of Luke (6.17), at the preaching of Jesus there were also faithful from the coast of Tyre and Sidon; and Jesus himself went to the region of Tyre and Sidon to work miracles such as the exorcism of the Syrophoenician woman's daughter  (Mark 7,24-31). Soon a Christian community was formed in the city, which was visited by Paul the Apostle (Acts of the Apostles 21: 3-7) on his last journey to Jerusalem before his arrest.

Industry
There is evidence in Josephus of substantial Jewish interest in silk, both in trade and production, especially in Berytus and Tyre. In the Roman period, Jiyeh was a production site of Beirut Type 2 amphorae transporting olive oil from the 1st century AD onwards.

Architecture
 Two lower Roman temples that date back to the 1st century AD, Niha, Zahlé.
 Roman temple of Bziza.
 Tower of Claudius, temple of Zeus, a sanctuary, and two altars, Qalaat Faqra, Kisrawan.
 A theatre and amphitheatre, baths and porticoes in the city of Berytus, built by Agrippa I.
 In the mid-1st century, a number of Julio-Claudian emperors enriched the sanctuary of the Temple of Jupiter, Baabek, causing it to be largely completed by AD 60 as evidenced by a graffito located on one of the topmost column drums.

See also 
 Christianity in the 1st century

Notes

References

Sources 
 
 
 Lyttelton, Margaret (1996). "Baalbek", in The Dictionary of Art, 34 volumes, edited by Jane Turner. New York: Grove. .
 

Lebanon
Centuries in Lebanon